Mehmed Rauf Pasha (1838 – 1923) was an Ottoman senator and liberal politician during the Second Constitutional Era, who was a member of the Freedom and Accord Party.

References 

1838 births
1923 deaths
Politicians from Istanbul
Politicians of the Ottoman Empire